Tongue-and-groove pliers are a type of slip-joint pliers.  They are also known as:
 adjustable pliers,
 Channellocks (i.e., Channellock brand pliers),
 water pump pliers,
 groove-joint pliers,
 arc-joint pliers,
 Multi-Grips,
 tap or pipe spanners,
 swan neck pliers.
 Monkey pliers.

Design
They have serrated jaws generally set 45 to 60 degrees from the handles. The lower jaw can be moved to a number of positions by sliding along a tracking section under the upper jaw. An advantage of this design is that the pliers can adjust to a number of sizes without the distance in the handle growing wider.  These pliers often have long handles—commonly 9.5 to 12 inches long—for increased leverage. The weight of the tool can also vary, depending on the material used.

Uses
Tongue-and-groove pliers are commonly used for turning and holding nuts and bolts, gripping irregularly shaped objects, and clamping materials. It is also possible to rotate objects while keeping them in one position.

History
This design of pliers was invented and popularized by the Champion–DeArment Tool Company in 1934 under the brand name Channellock (after which the company was later renamed) but are also now produced by a number of other manufacturers.

Gallery

References

Pliers